Heinrich Cornelius Agrippa von Nettesheim (14 September 1486 – 18 February 1535) was a German Renaissance polymath, physician, legal scholar, soldier, theologian, and occult writer.  Agrippa's Three Books of Occult Philosophy published in 1533 drew heavily upon Kabbalah, Hermeticism, and neo-Platonism. His book was widely influential among esotericists of the early modern period, and was condemned as heretical by the inquisitor of Cologne.

Early life and education
Agrippa was born in Nettesheim, near Cologne on 14 September 1486 to a family of middle nobility. Many members of his family had been in the service of the House of Habsburg. Agrippa studied at the University of Cologne from 1499 to 1502, (age 13–16) when he received the degree of magister artium.  The University of Cologne was one of the centers of Thomism, and the faculty of arts was split between the dominant Thomists and the Albertists. It is likely that Agrippa's interest in the occult came from this Albertist influence. Agrippa himself named Albert’s Speculum as one of his first occult study texts. He later studied in Paris, where he apparently took part in a secret society involved in the occult.

Military career
In 1508 Agrippa traveled to Spain to work as a mercenary.  He continued his travels by way of Valencia, the Baleares, Sardinia, Naples, Avignon, and Lyon. He served as a captain in the army of Maximilian I, Holy Roman Emperor, who awarded him the title of Ritter or knight.

Academic career

Agrippa's academic career began in 1509, receiving the patronage of Margaret of Austria, governor of Franche-Comté, and Antoine de Vergy, archbishop of Besançon and chancellor of the University of Dole. He was given the opportunity to lecture a course at the University on Hebrew scholar Johann Reuchlin's De verbo mirifico. At Dôle, Agrippa wrote De nobilitate et praecellentia foeminae sexus (On the Nobility and Excellence of the Feminine Sex), a work that aimed at proving the superiority of women using cabalistic ideas.  The book was probably intended to impress Margaret. Agrippa’s lectures received attention, and he was given a doctorate in theology because of them. He was, however, denounced by the Franciscan prior Jean Catilinet as a "Judaizing heretic", and was forced to leave Dôle in 1510.

In the winter of 1509-1510 Agrippa returned to Germany and studied with Humanist Johannes Trithemius at Würzburg. On 8 April 1510 he dedicated the then unpublished first draft of De occulta philosophia ("On the Occult Philosophy") to Trithemius, who recommended that Agrippa keep his occult studies secret. Proceeding to the Netherlands he took service again with Maximilian. In 1510 the king sent Agrippa on a diplomatic mission to England, where he was the guest of the Humanist and Platonist John Colet, dean of St Paul's Cathedral, and where he replied to the accusations brought against him by Catilinet (Expostulatio super Expositione sua in librum De verbo mirifico). In the reply he argued that his Christian faith was not incompatible with his appreciation for Jewish thought, writing "I am a Christian, but I do not dislike Jewish Rabbis". Agrippa then returned to Cologne and gave disputations at the university's faculty of theology.

Agrippa followed Maximilian to Italy in 1511, and as a theologian attended the schismatic council of Pisa (1512), which was called by some cardinals in opposition to a council called by Pope Julius II. He remained in Italy for seven years, partly in the service of William IX, Marquess of Montferrat, and partly in that of Charles III, Duke of Savoy, probably occupied in teaching theology and practicing medicine. During his time in northern Italy Agrippa came into contact with Agostino Ricci and perhaps Paolo Ricci, and studied the works of philosophers Marsilio Ficino and Giovanni Pico della Mirandola, and the kabbalah. In 1515 he lectured at the University of Pavia on the Pimander of Hermes Trismegistus, but these lectures were abruptly terminated owing to the victories of Francis I, King of France.

In 1518 the efforts of one or other of his patrons secured for Agrippa the position of town advocate and orator, or syndic, at Metz. Here, as at Dôle, his opinions soon brought him into collision with the monks, and his defense of a woman accused of witchcraft involved him in a dispute with the inquisitor, Nicholas Savin. The consequence of this was that in 1520 he resigned his office and returned to Cologne, where he stayed about two years. He then practiced for a short time as a physician at Geneva and Freiburg, but in 1524 went to Lyons on being appointed physician to Louise of Savoy, mother of Francis I. In 1528 he gave up this position, and about this time was invited to take part in the dispute over the legality of the divorce of Catherine of Aragon by Henry VIII; but he preferred an offer made by Margaret, duchess of Savoy and regent of the Netherlands, and became archivist and historiographer to the emperor Charles V.

Margaret's death in 1530 weakened his position, and the publication of some of his writings about the same time aroused anew the hatred of his enemies; but after suffering a short imprisonment for debt at Brussels he lived at Cologne and Bonn, under the protection of Hermann of Wied, archbishop of Cologne. By publishing his works he brought himself into antagonism with the Inquisition, which sought to stop the printing of De occulta philosophia. He then went to France, where he was arrested by order of Francis I for some disparaging words about the queen-mother; but he was soon released, and on 18 February 1535 died at Grenoble. He was married three times and had a large family.

During his wandering life in Germany, France, and Italy, Agrippa worked as a theologian, physician, legal expert, and soldier. Agrippa was for some time in the service of Maximilian I, probably as a soldier in Italy, but devoted his time mainly to the study of the occult sciences and to problematic theological legal questions, which exposed him to various persecutions through life, usually in the mode described above: He would be privately denounced for one sort of heresy or another. He would only reply with venom considerably later (Nauert demonstrates this pattern effectively).

No evidence exists that Agrippa was seriously accused, much less persecuted, for his interest in or practice of magical or occult arts during his lifetime, although it was known he argued against the persecution of witches. It is impossible, of course, to cite negatively, but Nauert, the best bio-bibliographical study to date, shows no indication of such persecution, and Van der Poel's careful examination of the various attacks suggest that they were founded on quite other theological grounds.

Recent scholarship (see Further Reading below, in Lehrich, Nauert, and Van der Poel) generally agrees that this rejection or repudiation of magic is not what it seems: Agrippa never rejected magic in its totality, but he did retract his early manuscript of the Occult Philosophy – to be replaced by the later form.

In the Third Book of Occult Philosophy, Agrippa concludes with:

According to his student Johann Weyer, in the 1563 book De praestigiis daemonum, Agrippa died in Grenoble, in 1535.

Works

Agrippa is perhaps best known for his books.

De incertitudine et vanitate scientiarum atque artium declamatio invectiva (Declamation Attacking the Uncertainty and Vanity of the Sciences and the Arts, 1526; printed in Cologne 1527), a skeptical satire of the sad state of science. This book, a significant production of the revival of Pyrrhonic skepticism in its fideist mode, was to have a significant influence on such thinkers and writers as Montaigne, Descartes and Goethe.

Declamatio de nobilitate et praecellentia foeminei sexus (Declamation on the Nobility and Preeminence of the Female Sex, 1529), a book pronouncing the theological and moral superiority of women. Edition with English translation, London 1652

De occulta philosophia libri tres (Three Books Concerning Occult Philosophy, Book 1 printed Paris 1531; Books 2–3 in Cologne 1533). This summa of occult and  magical thought, Agrippa's most important work in a number of respects, sought a solution to the skepticism proposed in De vanitate. In short, Agrippa argued for a synthetic vision of magic whereby the natural world combined with the celestial and the divine through Neoplatonic participation, such that ordinarily licit natural magic was in fact validated by a kind of demonic magic sourced ultimately from God. By this means Agrippa proposed a magic that could resolve all epistemological problems raised by skepticism in a total validation of Christian faith.

One example of the text, not especially indicative of its broader contents, is Agrippa's analysis of herbal treatments for malaria in numeric terms:

Rabanus also, a famous Doctor, composed an excellent book of the vertues of numbers: But now how great vertues numbers have in nature, is manifest in the hearb which is called Cinquefoil, i.e. five leaved Grass; for this resists poysons by vertue of the number of five; also drives away divells, conduceth to expiation; and one leafe of it taken twice in a day in wine, cures the Feaver of one day: three the tertian Feaver: foure the quartane. In like manner four grains of the seed of Turnisole being drunk, cures the quartane, but three the tertian. In like manner Vervin is said to cure Feavers, being drunk in wine, if in tertians it be cut from the third joynt, in quartans from the fourth.

The book was a major influence on such later magical thinkers as Giordano Bruno and John Dee. The book (whose early draft, quite different from the final form, circulated in manuscript long before it was published) is often cited in discussions of Albrecht Dürer's famous engraving Melencolia I (1514).

A spurious Fourth book of occult philosophy, sometimes called Of Magical Ceremonies, has also been attributed to him; this book first appeared in Marburg in 1559 and is not believed to have been written by Agrippa.

Modern editions
De occulta philosophia libri tres. Ed. Vittoria Perrone Compagni. Leiden and Boston: Brill, 1992: .
The Philosophy of Natural Magic, Translated by James Freake, Edited by L. W. de Laurence (1913).  (Only book one)
The Philosophy of Natural Magic, Translated by James Freake, Edited by Leslie Shepherd (1974).  University Books. (Only book one; reprint of the Laurence edition)
Three Books of Occult Philosophy, Translated by James Freake, Annotated by Donald Tyson (2005). Llewelyn Worldwide.
Three Books of Occult Philosophy Book One: A Modern Translation, Translated by Eric Purdue (2012). Renaissance Astrology Press.
Declamation on the Nobility and Preeminence of the Female Sex. Translated by Albert Rabil, Jr. Chicago: University of Chicago Press, 1996: 
Female Preeminence: An Ingenius Discourse. Translated by H.C., Edited by Tarl Warwick (2016).
Of the Vanitie and Vncertaintie of Artes and Sciences. Edited by Catherine M. Dunn. Northridge, CA: California State University Foundation, 1974. ASIN: B0006CM0SW
De Arte Chimica (attributable to) Henry Cornelius Agrippa; a critical edition of the Latin text with a seventeenth-century English translation by Sylvain Matton, Paris: SÉHA; Milan: Archè, 2014
De Occvlta Philosophia — Four Books. Translated and edited by Paul Summers Young, 2020. Black Letter Press, Germany

See also

References

Notes

Citations

Works cited

Further reading

 
 
  
 
 
  The only in-depth scholarly study of Agrippa's occult thought.
  An examination of one of Agrippa's university orations, on the subject of love, from a Neoplatonic and Cabalistic perspective.
 
  The first serious bio-bibliographical study.
 
 
 

 
  Detailed examination of Agrippa's minor orations and the De vanitate by a Neo-Latin philologist.
 
  Provides a scholarly summary of Agrippa's occult thoughts in the context of Hermeticism.

External links

 
  Website devoted to Agrippa's Life
Writings of Agrippa
Article in the Catholic Encyclopedia
Online Galleries, History of Science Collections, University of Oklahoma Libraries  High resolution images of works by and/or portraits of Agrippa in .jpg and .tiff format.
Magische Werke – From the Harry Houdini Collection at the Library of Congress
De occulta philosophia – From the Collections at the Library of Congress
De occulta philosophia. Book 4 – From the Collections at the Library of Congress
 Querelle | Heinrich Cornelius Agrippa von Nettesheim Querelle.ca is a website devoted to the works of authors contributing to the pro-woman side of the querelle des femmes.

1486 births
1535 deaths
16th-century alchemists
16th-century astrologers
16th-century German Catholic theologians
16th-century German jurists
16th-century German male writers
16th-century German physicians
16th-century German writers
16th-century Latin-language writers
16th-century occultists
Christian occultists
Creators of writing systems
German alchemists
German astrologers
German male non-fiction writers
German occultists
German occult writers
German Renaissance humanists
Physicians from Cologne